Bunnell Point is a summit in Mariposa County, California, in the United States.

Bunnell Point was named for the explorer Lafayette Bunnell.

References

Mountains of Mariposa County, California
Mountains of Northern California